The Podvinje cafe shooting was an act of mass murder that occurred in the village of Podvinje, Slavonski Brod, Brod-Posavina County, Croatia on April 14, 1998. at about 10 p.m., when 50-year-old Antun Mataić killed 7 people and wounded another.

Shooting
On April 13, 1998, at 7 p.m., Antun Mataić and his friend went to the Trenk cafe in Podvinje, stayed there for a short time, drank and left. Around 10 p.m. he returned to the cafe by himself. In the cafe were 9 guests, a waitress and the owner. Having paid for the cognac, he drank it and left the cafe. He went to his car which was parked in front of the bar and subsequently returned to the cafe with an automatic rifle which he aimed at the cafe's guests. One of the guests told him «Tunja, it was wrong», to which he replied «It would not be good». He started firing, the guests fell to the ground. He fired one shot from a pistol at each victim lying on the ground. The owner of the bar and one of the guests rushed to the ground in time and were able to escape. After the shooting, he got in the car and drove west. On the way he went to a cafe, ordered cognac and said «I had just killed eight people». He then went to a shooting range, which is located near lake Petnja, where he blew his car up and shot himself shortly thereafter.

Perpetrator
Antun Mataić (or Antun Matajić) (50) lived in Završje. He lost his family during the Croatian War of Independence and had repeatedly said that his life had no meaning, and that he would spend all his money in order to kill himself. He was a frequent visitor of the Trenk café.

See also
 1994 Osijek café shooting

References

1998 crimes in Croatia 
1998 murders in Europe 
1998 mass shootings in Europe
1990s murders in Croatia 
Attacks on restaurants in Europe
Deaths by firearm in Croatia
Mass murder in 1998
Mass murder in Croatia
Murder–suicides in Croatia
Mass shootings in Croatia